Armatocereus matucanensis is a species of Armatocereus from Ecuador and Peru.

References

External links
 
 

matucanensis
Flora of Ecuador